Thomas Virgil McGraw (born December 8, 1967) is an American former relief pitcher who played for the St. Louis Cardinals of Major League Baseball (MLB) during their 1997 season. Listed at 6' 2", 195 lb., McGraw batted and threw left-handed. He was born in Portland, Oregon.

McGraw attended Washington State University, where he pitched for the Cougars baseball team from 1987 to 1990.

References

External links

Retrosheet
The Baseball Gauge
Venezuela Winter League

1967 births
Living people
American expatriate baseball players in Canada
Baseball players from Portland, Oregon
Beloit Brewers players
Edmonton Trappers players
El Paso Diablos players
High Desert Mavericks players
Leones del Caracas players
American expatriate baseball players in Venezuela
Louisville Redbirds players
Major League Baseball pitchers
Ottawa Lynx players
Portland Sea Dogs players
St. Louis Cardinals players
Stockton Ports players
Trenton Thunder players
Washington State Cougars baseball players